The History of rugby union matches between Ireland and Italy dates back to New Year's Eve 1988 when Ireland defeated Italy in a tour test match, 31–15. Ireland have dominated the meetings, with the Italians having achieved four victories. The teams' most recent meeting was in the 2023 Six Nations in Rome, where Ireland won 20–34.

Summary

Overview

Records
Note: Date shown in brackets indicates when the record was or last set.

Attendance
Up to date as of 28 February 2023

Results

External links
Complete Results and Details at ESPN
Pick and Go Rugby test match database
Ireland v Italy stats on irishrugby.ie

References

Ireland national rugby union team matches
Italy national rugby union team matches
Six Nations Championship
Rugby union rivalries in Ireland
Rugby union rivalries in Italy